Fizzy Pop is Towers of London's second album. Released 6 October 2008, it contains the singles "Naked on the Dance Floor" and "Go Sister Go". It did not achieve a position in the UK top 75 album chart.

Track listing
"Naked on the Dance Floor"
"Go Sister Go"
"Time Is Running Out"
"1984 (Nanny Nation)"
"Queen of Cool"
"Start the Rupt"
"When She Comes"
"Avaline"
"If It Don't Feel Good"
"Bishops Gate"
"Beach Bar"
"New Skin"

B-sides

References

External links
 

2008 albums
Towers of London albums